Rho GDP-dissociation inhibitor 2 is a protein that in humans is encoded by the ARHGDIB gene. Aliases of this gene include RhoGDI2, GDID4, Rho GDI 2, and others.

Interactions 
ARHGDIB has been shown to interact with VAV1 and Src.

Gene family 
RhoGDI2 (ARHGDIB) is part of a family of three members: RhoGDI1, RhoGDI2 (also known as RhoGDIB, D4-GDI or Ly-GDI) and RhoGDI3.  RhoGDI1 is expressed in many organs and is the best studied member of the family. RhoGDI2 was initially believed to be expressed specifically in blood forming cells, but has subsequently been found to be highly expressed in a variety of other cell types as well. RhoGDI3 is predominantly expressed in brain, lung, kidney, testis and pancreas, and is targeted to specific parts of the cell such as the Golgi where it may play a role in transport or proteins in cells.

Disease involvement 
Despite a high degree of sequence similarity, RhoGDI1 and RhoGDI2 are very different in their binding affinities for specific GTPases, and more importantly, in their roles in tumor formation and spread of tumor to other organs (the process of metastasis).  For example, RhoGDI2 functions as a suppressor of metastasis but not a tumor suppressor in bladder cancer cells, while RhoGDI1 is a ubiquitous suppressor of tumor growth in all sites so far examined in bladder cancer models), suggesting that their cellular functions must diverge to cause these differential effects.

While there are clear links between the alteration of RhoGDI2 protein levels and disease progression and/or metastasis in several types of cancer, the mechanistic underpinnings of the mode of RhoGDI2 action under carcinogenic cellular conditions are only now beginning to be understood.  Evidence demonstrates that RhoGDI2 inhibits the endothelin axis and crosstalk with macrophages within the micrometastatic microenvironment to inhibit metastatic outgrowth. As such, RhoGDI2 could prove important in the regulation of tumor dormancy. Targeting this axis with orally available endothelin receptor antagonists may prove efficacious in mimicking the inhibitory role of RhoGDI2 by preventing macrophage infiltration into the micrometastatic niche. Recent work has also determined that genetic and pharmacologic targeting of chemokine (C-C motif) ligand 2 (CCL2) also known as monocyte chemotactic protein-1 (MCP-1) or small inducible cytokine A2, its receptor CCR2 and pharmacologic ablation of macrophages can also phenocopy the effect of RhoGDI2 expression to prevent metastatic colonization of the lung67 and that RhoGDI2 is suppressor of versican, a protein that has been shown to promote cell migration and metastasis in several tumor models.

In contrast to its role as a metastasis suppressor in bladder cancer, in breast, RhoGDI2 expression has been reported to be upregulated in cancer and to promote invasion of breast cancer cells, while another report found a biphasic expression pattern of RhoGDI2 in breast cancer with decreased expression correlating with lymph node metastasis.

ARHGDIB antibodies may be a marker for long-term kidney graft loss in recipients of deceased-donor kidneys.

References

External links

Further reading 

 
 
 
 
 
 
 
 
 
 
 
 
 
 
 
 

Genes
Human proteins